A tuque (toque) is a type of knit cap.

Tuque may also refer to:

 Tuque Creek, Warren County, Missouri, USA; a creek
 La Tuque, Quebec, Canada; a city in Mauricie on the Saint-Maurice River
 El Tuque, Ponce, Puerto Rico; a beach

 Tuque Games, a Canadian videogame developer

See also

 La Tuque (disambiguation)
 
 Touques (disambiguation)
 Toque (disambiguation)